Mahatha is a genus of freshwater crabs endemic to Sri Lanka. Four of the six species are critically endangered due to habitat loss, and two are listed as Least Concern on the IUCN Red List.

Species

Mahatha adonis
Mahatha adonis is a widespread species, known from the Mahaweli Basin, Knuckles Massif and Monaragala. It is considered a species of Least Concern by the IUCN.

Mahatha helaya
Mahatha helaya is only known from its type locality, near Kalupahana on the main Colombo-Haputale road, and is therefore considered critically endangered by the IUCN. The specific epithet helaya comes from the Sinhalese word for an inhabitant of Sri Lanka.

Mahatha iora
Mahatha iora is only known from its type locality, near the Dunhinda Falls, and is therefore considered critically endangered by the IUCN.

Mahatha lacuna
Mahatha lacuna is only known from its type locality, near Galle, and is therefore considered critically endangered by the IUCN. The specific epithet , from the Latin for "hole", refers to the deep burrow in which the species was found.

Mahatha ornatipes
Mahatha ornatipes was originally described in 1915 by Roux as Paratelphusa ornatipes, and was later described as Ceylonthelphusa inflatissima Bott, 1970. It is widespread in the wet zone of Sri Lanka and is considered a species of Least Concern by the IUCN.

Mahatha regina
Mahatha regina is only known from its type locality, near Pundaluoya, and is therefore considered critically endangered by the IUCN. The specific epithet  (Latin for "queen") refers to the species' "regal appearance".

References

Gecarcinucidae
Freshwater crustaceans of Asia
Crustaceans of Sri Lanka
Taxonomy articles created by Polbot